The National Institute for Compilation and Translation (NICT) was the highest translation agency in the Republic of China. It is in charge of translating academic and cultural texts, as well as textbooks. It was established on 14 June 1932, in Nanking, under the Ministry of Education. It was relocated to Beibei, Sichuan during the World War II. In June 1949, the Institute followed the ROC in its relocation to the island of Taiwan, and is currently located in Taipei's Daan District.

Among its other duties, the Institute publishes textbooks considered essential for the Taiwanese college entrance exam. In addition, before private Taiwanese companies were allowed to publish textbooks, the Institute was the sole supplier of textbooks for Taiwanese elementary and secondary schools.

See also
Education in Taiwan
Ministry of Education

References

External links
National Institute for Compilation and Translation

1949 establishments in Taiwan
Executive Yuan
Government agencies established in 1932